George Richard Barry (1825 – 31 January 1867) was an Irish Liberal politician.

He was elected as one of the two Members of Parliament (MPs) for Cork County in the 1865 general election, but did not complete a full parliamentary term before his death.

References

External links
 

1825 births
1867 deaths
Irish Liberal Party MPs
Members of the Parliament of the United Kingdom for County Cork constituencies (1801–1922)
UK MPs 1865–1868